Scaeosopha victoriensis is a species of moth of the family Cosmopterigidae. It is found in Zimbabwe.

The wingspan is about 15.5 mm. The ground colour of the forewings is yellowish-white, mottled with black scales and overlaid with black spots and patches. The hindwings are deep-grey.

Etymology
The species name refers to the Victoria Falls, the type locality.

References

Endemic fauna of Zimbabwe
Moths described in 2012
Scaeosophinae